The Slovak National Council was a Slovak political body, which was created in Vienna on  September 15–16, 1848 during the Revolutions of 1848. It was led by Ľudovít Štúr, Jozef Miloslav Hurban and Michal Miloslav Hodža.

It organised the Slovak Uprising in 1848-1849 within the Revolution of 1848, as well as executive power in Western parts of Upper Hungary (today mostly Slovakia) occupied by united Austrian-Slovak forces within their fight against the Hungarians.

The first meeting on the territory of contemporary Slovakia was in the house of Mrs. Koléniová in Myjava (then Miava). 
On 19 September 1848, the first national gathering of Slovaks took place in Myjava as part of the First Slovak Volunteer Campaign (from Vienna via Moravia to Slovakia). Ľudovít Štúr declared the independence of the Slovak nation from Hungary at the gathering. However, the Slovak National Council administered only Myjava and its surroundings and the volunteers were defeated after a few days.

The Slovak National Council also participated in the organization of the remaining Slovak volunteer Campaigns and other activities during the revolution. It ceased to exist in the autumn of 1849, after the revolution had been suppressed.

There is a commemorative tablet to the council near the Karlskirche in Vienna.

References

Political history of Slovakia
1848 establishments in the Austrian Empire
Slovak independence movement
Slovak National Council (1848-1849)